John Cowan (12 December 1870 – 1937) was a Scottish footballer who played in the Football League for Aston Villa and Preston North End.

Career
Cowan was born in Dumbarton; he began his football career with Vale of Leven and joined the stream of Scottish footballers playing in the English League in the summer of 1892, when he joined First Division Preston North End, making his Football League debut at Derby County that September. He missed only four matches as Preston finished runners-up in the League Championship and played for the club in the 1893 FA Cup semi-final replay, scoring in a 2–2 draw, and its second replay in which they were ultimately defeated 2–1 by Everton. He was a near ever-present in 1893–94, missing only one match and scoring four goals in Preston's 18–0 FA Cup first round rout of Southern League Reading in January 1894.

After 16 goals in 64 appearances for The Lilywhites he joined Rangers in the 1894 close season, making his debut against Dumbarton that August. He scored four goals in 17 appearances for the Glasgow club and played in a trial match for the Scottish national team which ultimately did not lead to any full caps before a return to England to join his elder brother James Cowan at Aston Villa the following August. Villa won the League in 1895–96; Cowan scored nine goals in 22 games that season and was part of a forward line that included Johnny Campbell, Jack Devey, Charlie Athersmith and Dennis Hodgetts.

The following season proved the most glorious for Aston Villa. On 30 January 1897, they beat Newcastle United 5–0 in the third round of the FA Cup,and went on to beat Notts County (2–0), Preston North End (3–2) and Liverpool (3–0) to reach the final against Everton. Aston Villa retained the League title ahead of the runners-up, Sheffield United, by 11 points. A crowd of over 60,000 arrived at The Crystal Palace to watch the 1897 FA Cup Final. Athersmith scored the opening goal but Everton hit back with goals from Jack Bell and Dickie Boyle. Aston Villa continued to dominate the game and added two more goals from Fred Wheldon and Jimmy Crabtree. That finished the scoring and therefore Aston Villa had emulated the great 'Invincibles' of Preston North End that achieved the FA Cup and Football League double in 1888–89. Villa scored 73 goals that season with Cowan scoring seven in 15 games.

However 1897–98 proved a disappointment, and Villa finished only sixth in the League, crashing out of the FA Cup in the first round, although Cowan still featured regularly. The following season however, as a result of the form of Stephen Smith, Cowan was unable to obtain a regular place in the 1898–99 League Championship winning team, only playing seven games that season. After 27 goals in 71 appearances for Villa, Cowan moved to Dundee Harp in June 1899 before his eventual retirement in May 1901.

Career statistics
Source:

References

1870 births
1937 deaths
Scottish footballers
Sportspeople from Dumbarton
Footballers from West Dunbartonshire
English Football League players
Scottish Football League players
Association football forwards
Vale of Leven F.C. players
Preston North End F.C. players
Rangers F.C. players
Aston Villa F.C. players
Dundee Harp F.C. players
Place of death missing
FA Cup Final players